Nurul Amin Talukdar (February 1946 – 4 June 2003) was a Bangladesh Nationalist Party politician who served as a member of Jatiya Sangsad in the 6th, 7th and 8th parliament representing the Netrokona-3 constituency.

Career
Talukdar was the company commander at Sector No. 11 during the 1971 Liberation War. He joined the BNP on 19 June 1995 and was the member of BNP's National Executive Committee.

Talukdar served as the chairman of Rainbow Group.

References

1946 births
2003 deaths
Bangladesh Nationalist Party politicians
6th Jatiya Sangsad members
7th Jatiya Sangsad members
8th Jatiya Sangsad members
People from Netrokona District